St Sadwrn's Church, Llansadwrn is a church in the village of Llansadwrn, Anglesey, Wales. It is dedicated to the Welsh saint Sadwrn, who is commemorated in a 6th-century inscribed stone inside the church. The current building was built in 1881, on the foundations of a medieval predecessor, to a design by Henry Kennedy of Bangor. It was designated a Grade II*-listed building on 30 January 1968.

References

External links
 

Llansadwrn